The Canyon News is a newspaper in Canyon, Texas.

History

Canyon News was founded in 1896 as "The Stayer".  It was later called "The Randall County News" and was called "Canyon News" by the early 1900s.

References

1896 establishments in Texas
Newspapers published in Texas